In database management, an aggregate function or aggregation function is a function where the values of multiple rows are grouped together to form a single summary value.

Common aggregate functions include:

 Average (i.e., arithmetic mean)
 Count
 Maximum
 Median
 Minimum
 Mode
 Range
 Sum

Others include:

 Nanmean (mean ignoring NaN values, also known as "nil" or "null")
 Stddev

Formally, an aggregate function takes as input a set, a multiset (bag), or a list from some input domain  and outputs an element of an output domain . The input and output domains may be the same, such as for SUM, or may be different, such as for COUNT.

Aggregate functions occur commonly in numerous programming languages, in spreadsheets, and in relational algebra.

The listagg function, as defined in the SQL:2016 standard
aggregates data from multiple rows into a single concatenated string.

In the entity relationship diagram, aggregation is represented as seen in Figure 1 with a rectangle around the relationship and its entities to indicate that it is being treated as an aggregate entity.

Decomposable aggregate functions 
Aggregate functions present a bottleneck, because they potentially require having all input values at once. In distributed computing, it is desirable to divide such computations into smaller pieces, and distribute the work, usually computing in parallel, via a divide and conquer algorithm.

Some aggregate functions can be computed by computing the aggregate for subsets, and then aggregating these aggregates; examples include COUNT, MAX, MIN, and SUM. In other cases the aggregate can be computed by computing auxiliary numbers for subsets, aggregating these auxiliary numbers, and finally computing the overall number at the end; examples include AVERAGE (tracking sum and count, dividing at the end) and RANGE (tracking max and min, subtracting at the end). In other cases the aggregate cannot be computed without analyzing the entire set at once, though in some cases approximations can be distributed; examples include DISTINCT COUNT, MEDIAN, and MODE.

Such functions are called decomposable aggregation functions or decomposable aggregate functions. The simplest may be referred to as self-decomposable aggregation functions, which are defined as those functions  such that there is a merge operator  such that

where  is the union of multisets (see monoid homomorphism).

For example, SUM:
, for a singleton;
, meaning that merge  is simply addition.
COUNT:
,
.
MAX:
,
.
MIN:
,
.

Note that self-decomposable aggregation functions can be combined (formally, taking the product) by applying them separately, so for instance one can compute both the SUM and COUNT at the same time, by tracking two numbers.

More generally, one can define a decomposable aggregation function  as one that can be expressed as the composition of a final function  and a self-decomposable aggregation function , . For example, AVERAGE=SUM/COUNT and RANGE=MAX−MIN.

In the MapReduce framework, these steps are known as InitialReduce (value on individual record/singleton set), Combine (binary merge on two aggregations), and FinalReduce (final function on auxiliary values), and moving decomposable aggregation before the Shuffle phase is known as an InitialReduce step,

Decomposable aggregation functions are important in online analytical processing (OLAP), as they allow aggregation queries to be computed on the pre-computed results in the OLAP cube, rather than on the base data. For example, it is easy to support COUNT, MAX, MIN, and SUM in OLAP, since these can be computed for each cell of the OLAP cube and then summarized ("rolled up"), but it is difficult to support MEDIAN, as that must be computed for every view separately.

Other decomposable aggregate functions 
In order to calculate the average and standard deviation from aggregate data, it is necessary to have available for each group: the total of values (Σxi = SUM(x)), the number of values (N=COUNT(x)) and the total of squares of the values (Σxi2=SUM(x2)) of each groups.

AVG:

or

or, only if COUNT(X)=COUNT(Y)

SUM(x2):
The sum of squares of the values is important in order to calculate the Standard Deviation of groups

STDDEV:
For a finite population with equal probabilities at all points, we have

This means that the standard deviation is equal to the square root of the difference between the average of the squares of the values and the square of the average value.

See also
Cross-tabulation a.k.a. Contingency table
Data drilling
Data mining
Data processing
Extract, transform, load
Fold (higher-order function)
Group by (SQL), SQL clause
OLAP cube
Online analytical processing
Pivot table
Relational algebra
Utility functions on indivisible goods#Aggregates of utility functions
XML for Analysis
AggregateIQ

References

Citations

Bibliography

Further reading

 Oracle Aggregate Functions: MAX, MIN, COUNT, SUM, AVG Examples

External links
 Aggregate Functions (Transact-SQL)

Subroutines